Rodney D. Huddleston (born 4 April 1937) is a British linguist and grammarian specializing in the study and description of English.

Huddleston is the primary author of The Cambridge Grammar of the English Language, which presents a comprehensive descriptive grammar of English.

After graduating from Cambridge in 1960 with a First Class Honors degree in Modern and Medieval Languages, Huddleston earned his PhD in Applied Linguistics from the University of Edinburgh in 1963 under the supervision of Michael Halliday. He held lectureships at the University of Edinburgh, University College London, and the University of Reading. He moved to The University of Queensland in 1969, where he remained for the rest of his career. He was the recipient of the first round of 'Excellence in Teaching' awards at the University of Queensland in 1988. In 1990 he was awarded a Personal Chair. He is currently an emeritus professor at the University of Queensland, where he taught until 1997. In 1999, a  volume was produced "by colleagues past and present, friends and admirers of Rodney Huddleston, in order to honour his consistently outstanding contribution to grammatical theory and description": The Clause in English: In Honour of Rodney Huddleston.

Born in Cheshire, England, Huddleston and his wife Vivienne now reside on Sunshine Coast, near Noosa Heads in Queensland, Australia.

References

Partial bibliography 
 Huddleston, Rodney D. (1971). The Sentence in Written English: A Syntactic Study Based on an Analysis of Scientific Texts, Cambridge University Press. .
 Huddleston, Rodney D. (1976). An Introduction to English Transformational Syntax, Longman. .
 Huddleston, Rodney D. (1984). Introduction to the Grammar of English, Cambridge University Press. .
 Huddleston, Rodney D. (1988). English Grammar: An Outline, Cambridge University Press. .
 Huddleston, Rodney D., and Geoffrey K. Pullum (2002). The Cambridge Grammar of the English Language, Cambridge University Press. .
 Huddleston, Rodney D.; Pullum, Geoffrey K.; Reynolds, Brett (2022). A student's introduction to English grammar (2 ed.). Cambridge: Cambridge University Press. p. 157. .

External links 
 Press release on release of the CGEL from the University of Queensland

1937 births
Living people
Linguists from Australia
Linguists from the United Kingdom
Syntacticians
Writers from Manchester
Alumni of the University of Edinburgh
Linguists of English
Academic staff of the University of Queensland
Corresponding Fellows of the British Academy